The Aberdeen Channel Bridge is a double-track railway bridge in Hong Kong. It carries the MTR's South Island line over the Aberdeen Channel, linking Lei Tung station and Wong Chuk Hang station. Its name reflects the channel the bridge crosses.

The bridge carried one track of traffic in each direction. Construction of the bridge was started in 2011 and completed in 2015. The bridge is Ap Lei Chau's only rail connection to Hong Kong Island, before that, the first bridge, Ap Lei Chau Bridge was the only fixed link for long, has been used by road traffic was constructed and put into use since 1977.

See also
 Aberdeen Typhoon Shelters

Ap Lei Chau
Railway bridges in Hong Kong
MTR